The Men's Javelin Throw event at the 1960 Summer Olympics took place on September 7–8 at the Stadio Olimpico.

Records
Prior to this competition, the existing world and Olympic records were as follows:

Results

Qualifying round

Finals
The six highest-ranked competitors after three rounds qualified for the final three throws to decide the medals.

References

External links
Olympic Games Official Report 1960 Rome-Volume I
Olympic Games Official Report 1960 Rome-Volume II (Part 1)

M
Javelin throw at the Olympics
Men's events at the 1960 Summer Olympics